Anwar Hussain (11 November 1925 – 1 January 1988) was an Indian actor and producer. He was a popular character actor from the 1940s to 1982 and acted in over 200 Bollywood films. Some of his best known roles are from  Ab Dilli Dur Nahin, Gunga Jumna (1961), Shaheed, Baharon Ke Sapne, Victoria No. 203 (1972), Chori Mera Kaam, Loafer, Gaddar, Rafoo Chakkar and Jail Yatra. He was the son of singer-turned director Jaddanbai and thus, maternal half-brother to noted actress Nargis Dutt and Akhtar Hussain.

Hussain is best known for his roles in Gunga Jumna (1962) and Rocky (1981) with his nephew Sanjay Dutt.

Selected filmography

References

External links
 
 Anwar Hussain at Upperstall.com

1925 births
1988 deaths
Indian male film actors
Hindi film producers
Male actors in Hindi cinema
20th-century Indian male actors
Place of birth missing
Film producers from Kolkata
Male actors from Kolkata
Male actors in Punjabi cinema